Kaarlo Veikko Mäkelä (born 4 October 1909 Hamina) Is a Finnish diplomat and ambassador. He graduated as Master in Philosophy in 1945. He was a commercial representative in the Federal Republic of Germany from 1964 to 1968, before the embassy was established. Thereafter, he was Ambassador in Bucharest from 1968 to 1972, part of the administrative department of the Ministry for Foreign Affairs 1973–1974 and Ambassador in Bern from 1974 to 1976.

References 

Ambassadors of Finland to West Germany
Ambassadors of Finland to Romania
Ambassadors of Finland to Switzerland
1909 births
People from Hamina
Year of death missing
Permanent Representatives of Finland to the United Nations